Vincent B. Barker is a United States Army major general who currently serves as the Chief of Staff of the United States Transportation Command. Previously, he served as the Deputy Inspector General of the United States Army.

References

Living people
Place of birth missing (living people)
Recipients of the Defense Superior Service Medal
Recipients of the Legion of Merit
United States Army generals
United States Army personnel of the Iraq War
United States Army personnel of the War in Afghanistan (2001–2021)
United States Marines
Year of birth missing (living people)